Alejandro 'Álex' Lombardero Menéndez (born 1 March 1979 in Arteixo, Galicia) is a Spanish retired footballer who played as a midfielder.

Honours
Spain U20
FIFA World Youth Championship: 1999

References

External links

1979 births
Living people
Spanish footballers
Footballers from Galicia (Spain)
Sportspeople from the Province of A Coruña
People from A Coruña (comarca)
Association football midfielders
Segunda División players
Segunda División B players
Tercera División players
CD Lugo players
CP Mérida footballers
Mérida UD footballers
Atlético Madrid B players
AD Ceuta footballers
Rayo Cantabria players
Deportivo Alavés B players
Deportivo Alavés players
UDA Gramenet footballers
Spain youth international footballers
Spain under-21 international footballers